This American Life: Hand It Over—Stories from Our First Year on the Air is the first compilation album featuring radio broadcasts from This American Life. The two-disc set contains stories about Scott Carrier doing a documentary on schizophrenics, Ira Glass interviewing his mother, Dan Savage's "My Life As a Self Hating Republican," and Julia Sweeney's discussion of her cancer. The set was an incentive during a public radio fund-drive.

See also
Crimebusters + Crossed Wires: Stories from This American Life
Lies, Sissies, and Fiascoes: The Best of This American Life
Stories of Hope and Fear

Self-released albums
This American Life albums
1996 compilation albums